The St. Nicholas Church is a Romanian Orthodox church at 12 Ana Aslan Street in Brăila, Romania. It is the second oldest such building in the city, the first being the Church of the Holy Archangels Michael and Gabriel, and was built on the site of an older church that was burnt down by a fire. For a time it was the tallest building in the city, and thus, its bell tower served as an observation point for firefighters of Brăila to prevent fires.

The old St. Nicholas Church was built between 1835 and 1837, but a firefighter smoked in the bell tower of the church and provoked a fire. As a result, it was rebuilt between 1860 and 1865 with larger and more durable materials with the funding of several wealthy inhabitants of the city in the Gothic Revival style and according to the plans of architect Dimitrie Poenaru.

References

External links
 

Religious buildings and structures in Brăila
Romanian Orthodox churches in Brăila County
Historic monuments in Brăila County
Gothic Revival church buildings in Romania
Churches completed in 1865